Mills Music, Inc. v. Snyder, 469 U.S. 153 (1985), was a United States Supreme Court case in which the Court held that if the author of a work authorizes derivatives, the terms negotiated in exchange for that grant stand even if the grant is later rescinded. If the copyright holder deputizes another person to authorize derivative works, the law draws no distinction between such works and those directly authorized by the copyright holder.

The case was a dispute regarding publishing royalties for the popular song "Who's Sorry Now?", which Mills Music had licensed (through mechanical licenses) to recording companies, who created records of the song, or derivative works; after the death of Ted Snyder, the song's composer, his heirs terminated the agreement with Mills Music. They believed that Mills was no longer entitled to its share in the royalties. Mills, through the Harry Fox Agency, sued in federal court in New York, where it won, but was overturned in the Second Circuit, before finally appealing to the Supreme Court, which granted certiorari in March 1984.

References

External links
 

1985 in United States case law
United States Supreme Court cases
United States Supreme Court cases of the Burger Court
United States copyright case law